Department of Economic and Statistical Ananlysis, Haryana  (Hindi: योजना विभाग, हरियाणा) is a Ministry and department of the Government of Haryana  in India.

Description
This department came into existence when Haryana was established as a new state within India after being separated from Punjab.

Abhimanyu Sindhu is the cabinet minister in charge of this department from October 2014.

See also
 Government of Haryana

References

State Legal Services Authority
State agencies of Haryana
Government agencies with year of establishment missing